Viktor Semyonovich Maryenko (born 25 August 1929 in Yasynuvata; died 9 July 2007 in Petrovskoye) was a Soviet Ukrainian football player and coach.

Honours as a coach
 Soviet Top League champion: 1965.

External links
 

1929 births
People from Yasynuvata
2007 deaths
Soviet footballers
FC Shakhtar Donetsk players
FC Torpedo Moscow players
FC Metalist Kharkiv players
Soviet football managers
FC Torpedo Moscow managers
FC Ural Yekaterinburg managers
FC Lokomotiv Moscow managers
FC Shinnik Yaroslavl managers
FC Fakel Voronezh managers
Ukrainian football managers
Association football defenders
Sportspeople from Donetsk Oblast